Ronald Rich is a British supporting player best known for his role as Hans, the personal bodyguard of Ernst Stavro Blofeld in the 1967 James Bond film, You Only Live Twice.

Career
Rich has appeared twice in the Doctor Who serial The Time Meddler (1965), where he played 'Gunnar the Giant', a huge Viking warrior.
He also appeared in the Doctor Who episode Mission to the Unknown (also 1965).
Rich appeared in the Lance Percival Show (1965).
He appeared in Doctor in Clover (1965) as a student doctor.
Other film appearances include Alfie (1966), alongside Michael Caine.

In You Only Live Twice (1967) Ronald Rich plays Hans, the huge Aryan personal bodyguard of Dr. Blofeld, who remains behind when Blofeld flees from his hideout in a volcano.
James Bond and Hans fight on a bridge over a pool full of Piranhas. 
After a missed punch Bond flips Hans over his shoulder into the pool, remarking "Bon appetit!".
Esquire Magazine ranked Hans #41 in the list of James Bond Villains, saying, "As a character, Hans doesn't offer much. As an obstacle, he's terrific.
The actor and stuntman Joe Robinson coached Sean Connery in judo for the fight scene, and acted as double for Ronald Rich.
Lewis Gilbert directed Rich in both Alfie and You Only Live Twice.

Filmography

References

External links

Year of birth missing (living people)
Living people
English male film actors
English male television actors